Alistair Green is a British comedian, known for his videos on Twitter, as well as appearances in several television programmes including regular or recurring roles in Flowers, The Great and Mandy.

In 2022 he appeared as Owen in series 4 of Ghosts on BBC One.

References

External links 

 Alistair Green at British Comedy Guide
 Alistair Green, comedian tour dates at Chortle

Year of birth missing (living people)
Living people
British comedians
British comedy actors